Silvio Giolito (September 27, 1918 – September 30, 2006) was an American foil fencer. He competed at the 1948 and 1952 Summer Olympics.

References

External links
 

1918 births
2006 deaths
American male foil fencers
Olympic fencers of the United States
Fencers at the 1948 Summer Olympics
Fencers at the 1952 Summer Olympics
Sportspeople from New York City